Bromus anomalus, commonly known as nodding brome, is a species of flowering plant in the family Poaceae which can be found in such US states such as New Mexico and Texas and also in Canadian provinces such as Alberta, British Columbia, and Saskatchewan.

References

anomalus
Grasses of the United States
Grasses of Canada